Dietzel is a surname. Notable people with the surname include:

Paul Dietzel (1924–2013), American football player, coach and college athletics administrator
Paul Dietzel (businessman) (born 1986), American businessman
Roy Dietzel (1931–2018), American baseball player

See also
Dietel